Faust is a 1960 West German theatrical film directed by Peter Gorski. It is based on Goethe's Faust (1808) and adapted from the theater production at the Deutsches Schauspielhaus in Hamburg. It stars Peter Gorski's adoptive father Gustaf Gründgens as Mephistopheles and Will Quadflieg as Faust, and was chosen as West Germany's official submission to the 33rd Academy Awards for Best Foreign Language Film, but did not manage to receive a nomination. The film also won a Deutscher Filmpreis (transl.: German Movie Award) for an Outstanding Documentary or Cultural Film in 1961.

Cast

See also
 List of submissions to the 33rd Academy Awards for Best Foreign Language Film
 List of German submissions for the Academy Award for Best Foreign Language Film

References

External links

1960 films
1960s fantasy drama films
German fantasy drama films
West German films
1960s German-language films
Films based on Goethe's Faust
Films directed by Peter Gorski
Films directed by Gustaf Gründgens
Films set in the 16th century
Films set in the Holy Roman Empire
German films based on plays
1960 drama films
1960s German films